Alice Winocour (born 13 January 1976) is a French screenwriter and director.

Life and career 
Winocour was born in Paris, France, to a Jewish family. After studying screenwriting at La Fémis, Winocour made three short films and wrote the script for Vladimir Perisic's film Ordinary People (released in 2009).

Winocour's first feature film, Augustine, based on the relationship between Professor Charcot and his patient Augustine, was presented at the Cannes Film Festival in 2012 as part of the Critics' Week. Her second directorial film Maryland was selected to be screened in the Un Certain Regard section at the 2015 Cannes Film Festival.

Winocour also co-wrote the film Mustang with Deniz Gamze Ergüven. It was screened in the Directors' Fortnight section at the 2015 Cannes Film Festival. The film was selected as the French entry for the Best Foreign Language Film at the 88th Academy Awards.

She was named as a member of the jury of the International Critics' Week section of the 2016 Cannes Film Festival.

Her 2019 film Proxima premiered at the 2019 Toronto International Film Festival, where it received an honourable mention from the Platform Prize jury.

Filmography

References

External links 
 
 Rencontre avec Alice Winocour sur Grand-Écart.fr

1976 births
Living people
French women film directors
Film directors from Paris
French women screenwriters
French screenwriters